Joseph Francis Wolf, Jr. (born December 28, 1966) is a former professional American football player. Wolf, an offensive lineman, played nine seasons in the National Football League (NFL) for the Phoenix/Arizona Cardinals.  He played college football for Boston College.

Prior to entering Boston College, he played high school football for William Allen High School in Allentown, Pennsylvania. In 2016, he was inducted into William Allen High School's Hall of Fame

References

External links
Joe Wolf at Pro Football Archives

1966 births
Living people
American football offensive linemen
Arizona Cardinals players
Boston College Eagles football players
Sportspeople from Allentown, Pennsylvania
Phoenix Cardinals players
William Allen High School alumni
Players of American football from Pennsylvania